Michael Corrente (born April 6, 1959) is an American film director and producer. His films include A Shot at Glory, American Buffalo, Outside Providence, Brooklyn Rules and Federal Hill.

Federal Hill won the Audience Award in 1994 at France's Deauville Film Festival before being picked up for release by Trimark Pictures.

Filmography

Film

Television

Awards and nominations

References

External links

 Deauville Film Festival roster 1994
 
 Libby Langdon bio
 Rhode Island Film Office

1959 births
Living people
People from Pawtucket, Rhode Island
Film directors from Rhode Island